Rugby 08 is the last release in the Rugby series to be published by EA Sports. The game allows players to play as 20 different Rugby nations, both major and minor, and includes many tournaments, such as the Rugby World Cup, Tri Nations, Six Nations, Guinness Premiership and Super 14.

Rugby 08 was released prior to the 2007 World Cup in France. New modes include the Rugby World Cup and the World Cup Challenge mode. Other new gameplay features include simplified lineouts and defensive formations.

The international cover features Richie McCaw. Other players are featured in specific markets:
Australia and Asia — Wallabies captain Stirling Mortlock
France — McCaw and France flanker Yannick Nyanga
Ireland — former Ireland fly-half Ronan O'Gara
Italy — Current Azzurri Mauro Bergamasco and Mirco Bergamasco
South Africa — Former Springboks Schalk Burger, Bryan Habana, and André Pretorius
United Kingdom — McCaw and England wing Mark Cueto
New Zealand — Richie McCaw

The commentary is provided by Ian Robertson and former All Blacks great Grant Fox.

Reception

The game received "mixed or average reviews" on both platforms according to the review aggregation website Metacritic.  In Japan, Famitsu gave the PlayStation 2 version a score of one four, two sixes, and one five for a total of 21 out of 40.

References

External links
 

2007 video games
EA Sports games
HB Studios games
Multiplayer and single-player video games
PlayStation 2 games
Rugby union video games
Video games developed in Canada
Video games set in Argentina
Video games set in Australia
Video games set in France
Video games set in Ireland
Video games set in New Zealand
Video games set in South Africa
Video games set in the United Kingdom
Windows games